"Spider Woman" is a song by the British rock band Uriah Heep, released on their fifth studio album The Magician's Birthday in 1972. The song was written by David Byron, Mick Box, Gary Thain and Lee Kerslake. "Spider Woman" was released as the third and last single from the album, reaching number 14 in the German charts for twelve weeks. The B-side of the single is "Sunrise". The song was recorded in Lansdowne Studios, London, in September 1972.

The song is played with eight chords: E7+9, D, A, E, G, F, G# and F#. There is an intro at the beginning of the song and an outro for the ending.

Personnel
 Mick Box – Guitar
 David Byron – Vocals
 Ken Hensley – Keyboards, Guitar
 Lee Kerslake – Drums
 Gary Thain – Bass

Charts

References

1972 songs
Uriah Heep (band) songs
Songs written by Ken Hensley
Songs written by David Byron
Songs written by Lee Kerslake
Songs written by Gary Thain
Blues rock songs